Framasoft is a popular education social network created in November 2001 by , Paul Lunetta, and Georges Silva. Since 2014, it is supported by a nonprofit organization of the same name based in Lyon, France. Mainly focused on free software valorisation, it is divided into three main branches of activities based upon a collaborative model: promotion, dissemination and development of free software, and enrichment of the free culture movement and online services.

As a space for orientation, informations, news, exchange, and projects, Framasoft is one of the main French language portals to the free and open-source culture. Its community regularly brings resources and assistance to people who would like to get started with free software. They also accompany people wishing to replace their proprietary software with open-source solutions at any step of the migration from proprietary to free software, such as Microsoft Windows to Linux.

The entire Framasoft production is provided under Free license in order to promote participation and guarantee that everyone can benefit from it, without any appropriation whatsoever. Framasoft Free mentions is a corporate and non-profit third party.

Framasoft network 

List of Framasoft's products and services:

Framasoft network has around thirty projects with as many websites, usually named with a prefix "frama" and an independent ".org" as domain name. Those projects belong to three main categories: free and opensource software, free culture and free and open-source online services.

 The "free software" category is composed of a directory (Framalibre), a portable Application on USB drive (Framakey), a DVD (Framadvd), a software distributor (Framapack), and a list of the greatest free software projects (Framastart).
 The "free culture" category contains a news blog (Framablog), a Publishing (Framabook), an Anglo-French and a Spanish-French translation team (Framalang), a video platform (Framatube, a Peertube instance), and website to promote  free music (Framazic).
 The "online open source services" category contains more than 30 services: a text editor (Framapad, MyPads) and a spreadsheet (Framacalc), both collaboratives, a meeting planning and survey (Framadate), Mind-map (Framindmap) and vectorial drawing (Framavectoriel). User also have access to a search engine (Framabee: 2022-02: now just a redirect), 2 social network (Framasphère and Framapiaf), an interesting articles save service (Framabag), and a news service (Framanews: 2022-02: now just a redirect). Framabin (2022-02: now just a redirect) permits to share notes, Framapics images, and Framalink is an URL shortener. At last, Framagit is a Forge (software) easing collaborative programs development. All these services are personal datas and private life respectful and can be decentralized on one's own server by following guides available on Framacloud.
 The network also has an Internet forum called Framacolibri and an Online shopping, EnVenteLibre. Framasoft servers also host a few partners and friends websites.

Network history 
Some memorable dates in history of Framasoft's network:

Early days 
In October 1998 : Publication in ''Québec Science'' magazine of "Comment informatiser intelligemment les écoles" (How to put information technology in schools in a smart way) by Jean-Claude Guédon. "This article stroke Alexis Kauffmann so much, we can consider it led to the creation of Framasoft".

In November 2001 is the official birthdate of the Framasoft website, first one of the network, created by mathematic teacher Alexis Kauffmann. The name comes from "Framanet" (for FRench and MAthematics on an intraNET), an educational project made with Caroline d'Atabekian, a literature teacher, within a Seine-Saint-Denis middleschool. Framasoft began as a software section of this project, before getting its independence, acting as a free software directory for Windows.

In June 2002, Framasoft and AFUL start the campaign « Libérons les logiciels à l'école » ("Let's free softwares at school"). In September 2002, the website includes tutorials and an open forum.

In July 2003, the website is closed due to bandwidth overload on the shared host Amen. The website receives widespread support  and Amen became a partner of Framasoft, offering new hosting possibilities .

As an association 

In January 2004, Framasoft evolves with the creation of the Framasoft Association. The directory drops Freeware and is no longer restricted to Windows software. It became a collaborative project written by Thomas Cézard, Simon Leblanc, Paul Lunetta, Rui Nibau and Georges Silva. Subsequently, in February 2004, birth of the Framagora forum administered by Thierry Bernard.

In March 2005, French translation of TheOpenCD 2.0, a CD compilation of free software on Windows. Published in a special page of the magazine :fr:Freelog in June, the CD will also be shipped on the Ikarios mail order site of :fr:Nat Makarevitch. August 2005- sees the publication of the first version of Framakey  and the creation of an associated site by Pierre-Yves Gosset. In December 2005-, Framagora experiences a peak in traffic by becoming the main forum for monitoring enforcement of the  law.

In February 2007, the second book of the Framabook collection is published: "Simple like Ubuntu 6.10" by Didier Roche, which will later be reedited and updated. In June 2007, Framasoft receives the "Lutèce d'Or" for "the best conducted community action" during the event Paris Capitale du Libre. In August 2007, Framasoft added AdSense to its website, after a Framablog post reporting financial difficulties to host the network.

In January 2008, a third book in the Framabook's collection is published : Spip pratique 1.9, by Perline followed in March 2008 by Change for OpenOffice.org, a translation coordinated by Johann Bulteau (alias Yostral). According to fr:Wikio in June 2008, the Framablog article Firefox : and 1, and 2, and 3.0 ! has been the most cited article of the month in the French speaking blogosphere.

In January 2009, Framasoft set up a support website dedicated to collect donations and testimonies. February 2009 sees the official birth of the Framatube video project. In March 2009, the Framakey adds some  portable web applications, the « WebApps », to its catalogue. In the month of May 2009, the sixth book of the Framabook collection is published : it is a comic called Geekscottes - 1. PATH, le chemin by Nojhan. In the meantime, a booklet Sésamath is distributed in all French's high schools, containing a double-spread about free software and Framasoft and the Framadvd DVD. Another distribution the year after was set by masters students in multimedia and communications at Panthéon-Assas University. In June 2009, Framablog occupies the first position in the Wikio ranking of French blogs in the "Free Software" category.

In January 2010, while the Framapack project is online, the documentary Richard Stallman et la révolution du logiciel libre is published. For the occasion, éditions Eyrolles organize in Paris a meeting with Richard Stallman. In May 2010, Framasoft demonstrates to defend free software against the censorship of the exhibition « true exhib talking about the false » about counterfeiting, at Cité des sciences et de l'industrie. In October 2010, the association starts supporting financially the campaign « 1000 10 1 » to find 1000 patrons to contribute at 10 euros by month for one year. Framadvd school version was also published during that time, a project lead by Cyrille Largillier.
In January 2011, a new publication appeared in the Framabook collection called Produire du logiciel libre by Karl Fogel, as a collaborative translation. In March 2011, the project Framapad is online, followed in June 2011 by Framadate. In July 2011, publication of the cartoon GKND tome 2 : Le GNU du risque by Simon Giraudot in the Framabook's collection. Framasoft celebrates its 10 years with a radio show Place de la toile on France Culture in November 2011.

In February 2012, start the support campaign « Liberty Pack » with April, Framasoft and La Quadrature du Net. In October 2012, the first novel of the Framabook's collection is out #Smartarded - Le cycle des NoéNautes, I by Pouhiou. It also sees the release of the projets Framacalc, Framindmap, and Framavectoriel. In November 2012, Framasoft launch its 2013 support campaign and put online the Framazic project. In December 2012, launch of « Liberty Pack 2 », new support campaign shared with April and La quadrature du Net.

In January 2013, Framasoft joins other organisations such as Savoirscom1, Regards citoyens or the Open Knowledge Foundation France to refuse privatisation of domaine public by the Bibliothèque nationale de France. April 2013 sees an update of Framasoft main welcome page, then in September 2013, Framasoft announces its support to the « Romaine Lubrique »'s project about public domain cultural valuation.

De-google-ify Internet 

In June 2014, a crowdfunding campaign allowed Framasoft to add new features to Framapad, followed in October 2014 by the launch of the "De-google-ify Internet" campaign  (“Dégooglisons Internet” in French).  The association has launched its own social media too: Framasphère.

In March 2015, a new functionality was added to Framapad to avoid flooding servers with unused text. It became also possible to choose the data conservation time. In the meantime, the association developed a picture sharing tool (FramaPic) and an URL shortener (Huit.re / frama.link). Framasoft also took the opportunity to start their own code body hosting called Forge. In May 2015, Framasoft started a new Web search engine service (Framabee), in order to continue demonstrating that alternatives to Google are possible.

In October 2016, phase 2 of the De-google-ify campaign started and lead into the release of 6 new services:
 Framalistes: managing mailing lists
 Framanotes: dealing with all sorts of contents
 Framaforms: managing forms
 Framatalk: audio/video chat
 Framagenda: creating public or private calendars
In 2019, they started developing Mobilizon, a project to allow communities to organise events without depending on tech giants’ platforms.

The organization of the network 
The association "Framasoft" was founded in January 2004, about 3 years after first the publication of the web site.

Since Framasoft was becoming a large collaborative project, it became necessary to provide all the technical parts of a growing network, like ownership of domain names associated with a moral person, to accompany projects in a coherent way so they are part of a whole (starting with guarantee the open-source and free nature of the created resources) and also to represent Framasoft through more and more interventions in the field.

This association aims "to promote and disseminate the free culture and especially the open-source software culture". The founding is mainly based upon gift economy from users, collected through the Internet.

The association take part in many events, whether while giving conferences, or having a place, for example during the "Rencontres mondiales du logiciel libre" (''RMLL'', from 2004 until 2014), the first "Rencontres mondiales décentralisées du logiciel libre" in Saint-Joseph on the island of Réunion (from 2006 until 2014), "Paris Capitale du Libre" (from 2006 until 2008), the "Salon de l'Éducation" (from 2004 until 2006), the "Fête de l'Humanité" (from 2004 until 2009, and 2014) and also during many Install parties and local "Freeware Day" organized by GULL, like "Ubuntu Party" in Paris (from 2008 until 2011) and in Toulouse (from 2009 to 2010) or like JDLL in Lyon (from 2007 until 2010).

The association is a member of the April, of Wikimedia France and of the association of French-speaking freeware users AFUL. It collaborates with websites like Linuxfr, La Quadrature du Net, the Tristan Nitot Standblog or the formats ouverts's blog about open formats by Thierry Stœhr. In relation and support in the educator sector for initiatives (Sésamath, Scideralle, AbulÉdu, Developers and free software users Association for administration and territorials collectivities (Adullact) etc.) and cultural (Dogmazic, Copyleft Attitude, Creative Commons France, Divergence FM, etc.).

Notes and references

See also 
Others projects:

 PeerTube
 Sepia Search
 Open-source software
 Open source
 HandyLinux
 Mandriva Linux

External links 

 The Framasoft network's website
 The Framasoft blog
  on the Fediverse

Non-profit organizations based in France
Open-source movement
Framasoft
Date-matching software